Rooftop Rendezvous is an Australian television series which aired on ABC during 1959. It was a half-hour variety series hosted by Bill Brady and produced by Harry Pringle. Produced in Sydney, it was regularly kinescoped for broadcast in Melbourne (it is not known if it was also shown on ABC's stations in Brisbane and Adelaide). It is not known if any of these kinescope recordings still exist.

Format
It was a variety series featuring a mix of local and overseas performers. For example, one episode featured the Develleros (roller skaters), Jack Griffiths (trumpeter), Peggy Mortimer (vocalist), Warron Kermond (acrobatic dancer) and the Noel Gilmour Quintet.

References

External links
 

1959 Australian television series debuts
1959 Australian television series endings
Black-and-white Australian television shows
English-language television shows
Australian variety television shows
Australian Broadcasting Corporation original programming